The 2014 Texas A&M Aggies football team represented Texas A&M University in the 2014 NCAA Division I FBS football season. They were led by third-year head coach Kevin Sumlin and played their home games at Kyle Field. They were a member of the Western Division of the Southeastern Conference (SEC).  The Aggies finished the regular season 7–5 over all and 3–5 in SEC play.  They were invited to the Liberty Bowl, where they defeated the West Virginia Mountaineers, 45–37. With the victory, the Aggies won four straight bowl games for the first time in program history.

Preseason

Recruiting class
In the 2014 recruiting class, Texas A&M signed 22 players (21 not counting late qualifier J.J. Gustafson), 10 of which were included in the ESPN 300. The class was ranked 4th in the nation by ESPN, 6th by Rivals, and 7th nationally by Scout.

Personnel

Roster

Returning starters

Depth chart
Source:
Bold denotes a starter from the previous year

Schedule

Schedule Source:

Coaching staff

Game summaries
‡ New Kyle Field Attendance Record

No. 9 South Carolina

Kenny Hill broke Johnny Manziel's record for passing yards in a single game with 511, and also threw for 3 touchdowns. Tra Carson averaged a little more than 4 yards a carry (4.3) on 7 rushes for 30 yards and 3 touchdowns. Their performances helped the Aggies score on 8 of 12 possessions while compiling 680 yards of total offense over 37:28 minutes of possession. An important factor in the game was 3rd and 4th down efficiency. The Aggies converted 12 of 19 attempts on third down (63%) while going 2/2 on 4th down. The Gamecocks went only 2/9 on 3rd down (22%) and 0/1 on 4th down.

Texas A&M received the ball to open the game, with Trey Williams returning the kick to the 32-yard line. After several plays, including a pair of swing passes to RB Brandon Williams, a third-down conversion pass to TE Cameron Clear, and a 22-yard pass to WR Ricky Seals-Jones, Texas A&M was set up on the South Carolina 1-yard line, where Aggie RB Tra Carson ran the ball in to give the Aggies the first TD of the game with 11:27 on the clock. The Gamecocks' ensuring drive gained just 15 yards (14 of which was penalty yardage) before ending in a punt to the Aggies. A&M found more offensive success on their drive, including 19-yard and 18-yard passes to Josh Reynolds and Sabian Holmes respectively. However, they could not convert a 3rd and 3 at South Carolina's 15 yard line, and settled for the 33-yard field goal by Josh Lambo, extending the Aggies' lead to 10-0. However, South Carolina soon answered the points, with a 3rd-and-4, 69-yard pass to WR Nick Jones for a TD, which cut A&M's lead to 3. The Aggies' following drive led to a punt, and the Gamecocks would gain 22 yards on their next drive before the end of the 1st quarter, with the score still 10-7 Texas A&M.

South Carolina maintained possession to open the second quarter, but after a sack by LB A.J. Hilliard for −2 yards on third down, the Aggies got the ball back. Their possession had several explosive plays, including an 11-yard run by Trey Williams, a 21-yard pass to Ricky Seals-Jones, and a 15-yard pass to Edward Pope before being capped off by a 3-yard pass to Ricky Seals-Jones for the TD, making the score 17-7. The Gamecocks answered this score too, on a long 46-yard pass to Damiere Byrd for a touchdown, cutting the game to 17–14. Texas A&M’s offense proved difficult to stop, however, and their next possession contained more big-yardage plays, including a 19-yard pass to Ricky Seals-Jones, a 16-yard pass to RB Tra Carson, and the 14-yard pass to Edward Pope for the touchdown. South Carolina could not answer that score, giving the ball back to A&M with 3:35 to go in the half. Spurred on by a 21-yard pass to senior WR Malcome Kennedy, the Aggies made a quick 2 minute, 19 second drive for another TD by Tra Carson, putting the game at 31-14. South Carolina’s final drive of the half was highlighted by two big defensive plays from A&M. The first was a big hit from freshman safety Armani Watts to dislodge a touchdown pass on 2nd-and-10, followed directly by an 11-yard sack from freshman DE Myles Garrett. Facing a 4th-and-21, Carolina attempted and missed a 54-yard Field Goal.

The Gamecocks opened the second half with a 3-and-out, after which Texas A&M gained 66 yards on just 8 plays (highlighted by a 21-yard grab by freshman Speedy Noil), before a 5-yard catch from Josh Reynolds added A&M’s 5th touchdown of the game, making it 38-14. On the first play of South Carolina’s next drive, QB Dylan Thompson carried the ball for 6 yards, at which time Aggie redshirt sophomore LB A.J. Hilliard dislocated his ankle, forcing him out for the rest of the season. The Gamecocks would go on to score with a 5-yard TD toss to Pharoh Cooper, cutting into the A&M lead 38-21. With time running short, South Carolina attempted an onside kick, but it was A&M who recovered. Texas A&M’s offense could not be stopped, and they added another touchdown behind Tra Carson on a 3-yard run, extending their lead to 45-21. The Gamecocks answered once again, with two 27-yard passes to Jerell Adams and Pharoh Cooper respectively, before adding a touchdown with a 10-yard pass to Nick Jones to make it 45-28. Texas A&M’s ensuing possession ended in a punt (their first since the 1st quarter), but South Carolina could not capitalize, as their drive was cut short with and interception by Aggie safety Armani Watts.

The fourth quarter proved much less eventful than the previous three. The Aggies, after a 33-yard pass to Malcome Kennedy, scored to open the quarter, with a 2-yard run from Trey Williams. South Carolina gained 48 yards on their next drive, before failing to convert a 4th-and-10, turning the ball over to A&M with 10:05 left in the game. Possession never changed again, and the Aggies made it to the South Carolina 3 yard line before kneeling the ball to end the game.

Lamar

Rice

Sources:
Official Texas A&M Game Notes (PDF)

SMU

Sources:
Official Texas A&M Game Notes (PDF)

Just before halftime, SMU wide receiver Der'rikk Thompson ran out of bound after an overthrown pass and nearly ran into the Texas A&M mascot Reveille, but was knocked aside by Texas A&M Corps of Cadets member Ryan Kreider, the "Mascot Corporal". This made news headlines across the nation about the dedication of the Mascot Handlers to protect Reveille.

Arkansas

Sources:
Official Texas A&M Game Notes (PDF)

The Aggies scored a touchdown and an extra point in the first minute of the game, but the Razorbacks quickly overtook them, maintaining a lead that remained unbroken until the Aggies scored in overtime. The Aggies lagged for much of the game but made a comeback in the final quarter, sending the game into overtime with a score of 28–28. The Aggies lost the coin toss and went on offense. They quickly scored a touchdown and an extra point. The Razorbacks, shut down by the Aggies' defense, were unable to gain the 25 yards necessary for a touchdown that would have sent it into another overtime. The Aggies won with a final score of 35–28.

#12 Mississippi State

It was by far the biggest test for the Aggies that season  at Davis Wade Stadium. A&M scored quickly on their first drive but, were out scored the rest of the game.

#3 Ole Miss

#7 Alabama

After Texas A&M's 59-0 shutout loss to Alabama, the Aggies were unranked in the AP poll for the first time since October 6, 2012.

Louisiana-Monroe

Auburn

The Aggies came into Jordan–Hare Stadium as huge underdogs against number 3 Auburn. The first two drives on offense the Aggies were up, 14–0. Auburn scored quickly to tie the game, only to have the Aggies score two more touchdowns to go up 28–14. With a few seconds left Auburn's kicker Daniel Carlson attempted a field goal but had it blocked and returned for a score for the Aggies. In the second half Auburn tried to make another miracle comeback with three touchdowns to trail by 3. Two fumbles late in the game cost Auburn and the Aggies won, 41–38. This loss ended A&M's three-game losing streak in SEC play, and Auburn's 13-home-game winning streak, along with ending a playoff berth. Auburn fell to 9th while the Aggies returned to the top 25.

Missouri

LSU

West Virginia–Liberty Bowl

Rankings

References

Texas AandM
Texas A&M Aggies football seasons
Liberty Bowl champion seasons
Texas AandM Aggies football